The following linked articles list the judgments of the Constitutional Court of South Africa by year of delivery.

 List of judgments of the Constitutional Court of South Africa delivered in 1995
 List of judgments of the Constitutional Court of South Africa delivered in 1996
 List of judgments of the Constitutional Court of South Africa delivered in 1997
 List of judgments of the Constitutional Court of South Africa delivered in 1998
 List of judgments of the Constitutional Court of South Africa delivered in 1999
 List of judgments of the Constitutional Court of South Africa delivered in 2000
 List of judgments of the Constitutional Court of South Africa delivered in 2001
 List of judgments of the Constitutional Court of South Africa delivered in 2002
 List of judgments of the Constitutional Court of South Africa delivered in 2003
 List of judgments of the Constitutional Court of South Africa delivered in 2004
 List of judgments of the Constitutional Court of South Africa delivered in 2005
 List of judgments of the Constitutional Court of South Africa delivered in 2006
 List of judgments of the Constitutional Court of South Africa delivered in 2007
 List of judgments of the Constitutional Court of South Africa delivered in 2008
 List of judgments of the Constitutional Court of South Africa delivered in 2009
 List of judgments of the Constitutional Court of South Africa delivered in 2010
 List of judgments of the Constitutional Court of South Africa delivered in 2011
 List of judgments of the Constitutional Court of South Africa delivered in 2012
 List of judgments of the Constitutional Court of South Africa delivered in 2013
 List of judgments of the Constitutional Court of South Africa delivered in 2014
 List of judgments of the Constitutional Court of South Africa delivered in 2015
 List of judgments of the Constitutional Court of South Africa delivered in 2016
 List of judgments of the Constitutional Court of South Africa delivered in 2017
 List of judgments of the Constitutional Court of South Africa delivered in 2018
 List of judgments of the Constitutional Court of South Africa delivered in 2019
 List of judgments of the Constitutional Court of South Africa delivered in 2020
 List of judgments of the Constitutional Court of South Africa delivered in 2021
 List of judgments of the Constitutional Court of South Africa delivered in 2022

External links
 Constitutional Court official website
 Constitutional Court judgments at SAFLII